The 1901 Nashville Garnet and Blue football team represented the University of Nashville during the 1901 college football season. The second of first two opponents is unknown. The 1901 team was likely the best football team in Nashville's history. Coached by Charley Moran, though they lost to southern power Vanderbilt, they "mopped up with about everything else."

Schedule

Season summary

at Mooney School

To open the season, Nashville defeated the Mooney School 11–0.

The starting lineup was Choate (left end), Blackburn (left tackle), Majors (left guard) Hawkins (center), Peake (right guard), Keller (right tackle), Kuykendall (right end), Church (quarterback), Reeves (left halfback), F. White (right halfback), Holland (fullback).

at Texas

Nashville tied the Texas Longhorns 5–5, in front of what was then the largest crowd ever to see a game in Dallas.

The starting lineup was Choate (left end), Blackborn (left tackle), Peake (left guard) Hawkins (center), Majors (right guard), Keller (right tackle), Kuykendall (right end), Pollard (quarterback), Reeves (left halfback), F. White (right halfback), Biddle (fullback).

Auburn
Nashville upset Auburn 23–5.

Tennessee
Nashville surprised again and beat Tennessee 16–5. Tennessee had just come off a tie of Clemson, when Clemson had in turn come off a 122–0 victory on opening day.

Sewanee

Sources:

Arguably the year's biggest win, Nashville kept up its win streak and beat Sewanee 39–6, then the worst defeat ever suffered by Sewanee. Nashville simply outweighed the Tigers. Ormond Simkins scored first. Biddle once got a touchdown on a 35-yard run.

The starting lineup was Choate (left end), Blackburn (left tackle), Majors (left guard) Hankins (center), Peake (right guard), Keller (right tackle), Kuykendall (right end), Pollard (quarterback), Reeves (left halfback), F. White (right halfback), Biddle (fullback).

at Kentucky University
Nashville beat state champion Kentucky University in Lexington 5–0.
Kentucky governor J. C. W. Beckham made a 15-yard kick to ceremonially start the contest. Fullback Bidwell made the touchdown.

at Vanderbilt

Three Nashville players were ruled ineligible. The Commodores practiced in secret for ten days in preparation. Vanderbilt faced Nashville on Thanksgiving Day and won 10–0 in front of  4 to 5,000 spectators, using "Harvard tactics." After thirty minutes of gameplay, John Edgerton scored a touchdown taking the wind out of the sails of Nashville rooters. A riot broke out downtown the next day. According to the account of the event in the Nashville Banner (repudiated in the Hustler), the trouble started when a number of Vanderbilt students "tried to paint the stone fence of the University of Nashville yellow and black."

The starting lineup was Choate (left end), Blackborn (left tackle), Majors (left guard) Hankins (center), Peake (right guard), Keller (right tackle), Kuykendall (right end), Pollard (quarterback), Reeves (left halfback), F. White (right halfback), Biddle (fullback).

Postseason
Amidst charges of professionalism, Nashville was blacklisted from the SIAA.

References

Nashville
Nashville Garnet and Blue football seasons
Nashville Garnet and Blue football